Anita Žnidaršic (born 1 March 1996) is a Slovenian professional racing cyclist.

See also
 List of 2015 UCI Women's Teams and riders

References

External links

1996 births
Living people
Slovenian female cyclists
Place of birth missing (living people)
20th-century Slovenian women
21st-century Slovenian women